Meir Goldwicht is an Orthodox rabbi and rosh yeshiva at Yeshiva University in Washington Heights, Manhattan. He was born in Israel, studied in Yeshivat Kerem B'Yavneh under his uncle Rabbi Chaim Yaakov Goldvicht, the Rosh Yeshiva, and had close ties to Rabbi Shlomo Zalman Auerbach and Rabbi Ovadia Yosef.

Early life and education
Goldwicht studied initially under Rabbi Yiśakhar Meʼir at Yeshivat HaNegev, and from there he continued to Kerem BeYavneh, which was founded and headed by his uncle Rabbi Chaim Yaakov Goldvicht. At Kerem BeYavneh, Goldwicht established close ties with Rabbi Zalman Nechemia Goldberg, with whom he was a Chavrusa. He also participated in a study group (chaburah) with Rabbis Shlomo Fisher, Yeshayahu Hadari, and Moshe Shapira (the philosopher). He attributes the bulk of his Torah to them.
Goldwicht received semicha from Rabbi Zalman Nechemia Goldberg in 1980, as well as Rabbis Betzalel Zolti and Ovadia Yosef. He also served as Maggid Shiur in Kerem B'Yavneh before coming to Yeshiva University.

Career
Goldwicht is the Joel and Maria Finkle Visiting Israeli Rosh Yeshiva and a rosh yeshiva at the Yeshiva Program/Mazer School of Talmudic Studies at Yeshiva University. He is also head rosh yeshiva at the Irving I. Stone Beit Midrash Program. In his early years in America, he received regular correspondences from Rabbi Shlomo Zalman Auerbach encouraging him and praising him for his continued efforts to teach Torah.

In addition to his regular classes at Yeshiva University, Goldwicht delivers shiurim extensively all over the New York metropolitan area and in Israel. A popular lecturer who delivers more than 1,000 lectures every year, Goldwicht has been described as “an absolute phenomenon” by Rabbi Zevulun Charlop for his colorful style that captivates audiences. "Rabbi Meir Goldwicht is an iconic steward of a 3,000-year-old heritage of Jewish learning,” said Dr. Ari Berman. He received the presidential medallion from Yeshiva University in 2017.

Goldwicht is also Rosh Kollel at Camp Mesorah.

Family

Goldwicht's sons include Rabbi Elyada Goldwicht, founder of the Semichat Chaver Program, Rabbi Eitiel Goldwicht, a rabbi at Aish HaTorah and founder of Aish Israel and assistant rabbi of Beit Knesset Hanassi in Rehavia, and Rabbi Aviad Goldwicht, who has a regular shiur in Beit Kenesset Chorev in Rechavia and is on his third cycle of Daf Yomi beIyun in English.

Published works
 Meir Panim, Elul and Moadei Tishrei, 2019
 Meir Panim, Chanukah and Purim, 2020
 Meir Panim, Haggadah Shel Pesach, 2021

References

External links
Official YU biography and shiurim
 Shiurim on Radio Kol Chai
 Shiurim on Kol HaLashon
 Shiurim on Yeshiva.org.il
 Shiurim on MeirTV
 Shiurim on YouTube
 Shiurim on Arutz 7

Yeshiva University rosh yeshivas
American Modern Orthodox rabbis
20th-century American rabbis
21st-century American rabbis
20th-century Israeli rabbis
Living people
Year of birth missing (living people)